Rajnkovec is a small settlement in the Municipality of Rogaška Slatina in eastern Slovenia, next to the border with Croatia. It lies south of the town of Rogaška Slatina, on a side road leading to the villages of Pristavica and Nimno. The area belongs to the traditional Styria region and is now included in the Savinja Statistical Region.

References

External links
Rajnkovec on Geopedia

Populated places in the Municipality of Rogaška Slatina